A  retroverted uterus (tilted uterus, tipped uterus) is a uterus that is oriented posteriorly, towards the back of the body. This is in contrast to the typical uterus, which is oriented forward (slightly "anteverted") toward the bladder, with the anterior part slightly concave. Depending on the source, one in three to five uteruses is retroverted, or oriented backwards towards the spine.

Related terms 
The following table distinguishes among some of the terms used for the position of the uterus:

A retroverted uterus should be distinguished from the following:

Additional terms include:
 retrocessed uterus: both the superior and inferior ends of the uterus are pushed posteriorly
 severely anteflexed uterus: a pronounced forward bend in an anteflexed uterus
 vertical uterus: the fundus (top of the uterus) is straight up

Causes 
In most cases, a retroverted uterus is a normal variation present from birth.  There are other factors, however, that can cause the uterus to become retroverted. Pelvic surgery, pelvic adhesions, endometriosis, fibroids, pelvic inflammatory disease, or the labor of childbirth can change the position of the uterus to retroverted.

Diagnosis 

A retroverted uterus is usually noted during a routine pelvic examination or with an internal ultrasound.

It usually does not pose any medical problems, though it can be associated with dyspareunia (pain during sexual intercourse) and dysmenorrhea (pain during menstruation).

Fertility and pregnancy 
Rarely, a retroverted uterus is due to a disease such as endometriosis, an infection or prior surgery. Those conditions, but not the position of the uterus itself, can reduce fertility in some cases. A tipped uterus will usually move to the middle of the pelvis during the 10th to 12th week of pregnancy.  Rarely (1 in 3,000 to 8,000 pregnancies), a retroverted uterus will cause painful and difficult urination and can cause severe urinary retention. Treatment for this condition (called "incarcerated uterus") includes manual anteversion of the uterus, and usually requires intermittent or continuous catheter drainage of the bladder until the problem is rectified or spontaneously resolves by the natural enlargement of the uterus, which brings it out of the tipped position. In addition to manual anteversion and bladder drainage, treatment of urinary retention due to a retroverted uterus can require the use of a pessary, or even surgery.
If a uterus does not reposition, it may be labeled persistent.

Treatment 

Treatment options are rarely needed, and include exercises, a pessary, manual repositioning, and surgery.

References

External links 
 
 Overview at mayoclinic.com
 Diagram at womens-health.co.uk

Noninflammatory disorders of female genital tract